I Can See You is a Philippine television drama romance anthology broadcast by GMA Network. It premiered on September 28, 2020 on the network's Telebabad line up. The series concluded on February 4, 2022 with a total of 3 seasons and 58 episodes. It was replaced by Mano Po Legacy: The Family Fortune in its timeslot.

The series is streaming online on YouTube.

Cast and characters

Season 1
Love on the Balcony
 Alden Richards as Inigo "Gio" Mapa
 Jasmine Curtis-Smith as Lea Carbonel
 Pancho Magno as Val Valdez
 Denise Barbacena as Deedee Quijano
 Shyr Valdez as Connie Mapa

The Promise
 Paolo Contis as Frank Agoncillo
 Andrea Torres as Ivy Teodoro
 Benjamin Alves as Jude Agoncillo
 Maey Bautista as Rowena Marquez
 Yasmien Kurdi as Clarisse Agoncillo

High-Rise Lovers
 Lovi Poe as Samantha "Sam" Alvarez
 Winwyn Marquez as Ysabel Ortiz 
 Tom Rodriguez as Luisito "Luis" Alvarez
 Teresa Loyzaga as Greta
 Divine Tetay as Ru Paul
 Ruru Madrid as Jared

Truly. Madly. Deadly.
 Jennylyn Mercado as Coleen De Vera 
 Dennis Trillo as Andrew "Drew" Rivera / Warren Devira
 Rhian Ramos as Abby Lopez
 Jhoana Marie Tan as Tere
 Ruby Rodriguez as Marge
 Ollie Espino as Jerry

Season 2
On My Way to You!
 Ruru Madrid as Jerrick Alfonso
 Shaira Diaz as Racquel "Raki" Buena-Alfonso
 Malou de Guzman as Viviana "Manang Baby" Fajardo
 Arra San Agustin as Samantha "Tammy" Razon 
 Gil Cuerva as Albert Manansala
 Ashley Rivera as Lani Paras
 Richard Yap as George Alfonso 
 Gelli de Belen as Rosanna Alfonso 
 Robert Seña as Rod Buena
 Isay Alvarez as Ellie Buena

#Future
 Miguel Tanfelix as Vinchie Torres
 Kyline Alcantara as Lara Dacer
 Aiko Melendez as Menchie Torres
 Gabby Eigenmann as Elvin Torres
 Mikoy Morales as Royce Carlos
 Dani Porter as Analyn Fuentes
 J-Mee Katanyag as Kakai
 Francis Mata as Walter

The Lookout
 Barbie Forteza as Emma Castro
 Paul Salas as Marius Penuliar
 Christopher de Leon as Robert Penuliar
 Adrian Alandy as Jason "Lakay" Bautista
 Arthur Solinap as Randy Penuliar
 Marina Benipayo as Tessa Penuliar
 Elijah Alejo as Christine Penuliar
 Ella Cristofani as Joanne Castro
 Luis Hontiveros as Dalo
 Jana Trias as Minda
 Benjie Paras as a captain

Season 3
AlterNate
 Dingdong Dantes as Jonathan "Nate" David / Michael Trajano
 Beauty Gonzalez as Sheila David
 Ricky Davao as Lyndon David
 Jackie Lou Blanco as Carmencita "Cita" David
 Joyce Ching as Angelica "Angie" Trajano
 Bryan Benedict as Joey
 Yan Yuzon as Darwin Trinidad

Episodes

Season 1

Season 2

Season 3

Ratings
According to AGB Nielsen Philippines' Nationwide Urban Television Audience Measurement People in television homes, the final two episodes of the second season of I Can See You earned a 17.6% rating.

References

External links
 
 

2020 Philippine television series debuts
2022 Philippine television series endings
Filipino-language television shows
GMA Network original programming
Philippine anthology television series
Television shows set in the Philippines